Uddharanpur is a village in Ketugram II CD block in Katwa subdivision of Purba Bardhaman district in West Bengal, India. The village named after the Hindu king (Suryavanshi) Uddharan Dutta Ghosh  who was the  famous Zamindar (Nairaja of Naihati old  Nabahatta) in Naihati and later a close associate of Nityananda Prabhu and Sri Chaitanya Mahaprabhu.The bloodline still continues till date Uddharan Dutta Ghosh

Divankara Dutta Ghosh

Subhroto Dutta Ghosh

Ganga Ghosh

Sanju Ghosh

Horolal Ghosh

Subhash Ghosh

Ananda Ghosh

Goutam Ghosh

Gurudipita Ghosh

, .

Geography

Demographics
As per the 2011 Census of India Uddharanpur had a total population of 3,437, of which 1,831 (53%) were males and 1,606 (47%) were females. Population below 6 years was 330. The total number of literates in Uddharanpur was 2,667 (85.84% of the population over 6 years).

Festivals and Culture 

There are many festival in Uddharanpur. The Annual fair of Uddharanpur is very popular. People from many other places are come to join the fair. It is held on January, beside the Uddharanpur Bazar in the Melar Math. The saint novelist Kalikananda Abadhuta (1910 — 1978) resided in the Burning Ghat of Uddharanpur beside the Bhagirathi River. He wrote a novel on this village named Uddharanpurer Ghat. based on the life of the village.

Schools 
 Uddharanpur G.S.F.P School
 Uddharanpur Madhyamik Sikshya Kendra

Connectivity 
The village is well connected to Bolpur-Shantiniketan and Asansol by the buses plying on Bolpur road. In order to reach the village via railways one has to get down on Gangatikuri railway station which lies on the Katwa-Azimganj line route. The village can be reached by the waterways by the ferries plying on Hooghly river from Katwa and Bhagyabantipur village (in Nadia district). It is connected to the nearby town of Katwa via roadways and waterways.

References

Villages in Purba Bardhaman district